Mala Bosna is a village located in the Subotica municipality, in the North Bačka District of Serbia. It is situated in the autonomous province of Vojvodina. The village is ethnically mixed and its population numbering 1,245 people (2002 census).

Name
In Serbo-Croatian the village is known as Мала Босна or Mala Bosna, and in Hungarian as Kisbosznia. Its name means "Little Bosnia" because of the local South Slavic inhabitants who originally migrated from Bosnia.

Ethnic groups (2002 census)

Croats = 621 (49.88%)
Bunjevci = 283 (22.73%)
Hungarians = 92 (7.39%)
Serbs = 69 (5.54%)
Yugoslavs 69 (5.54%)
ethnic Muslims = 24 (1.93%)

Historical population

1961: 2,883
1971: 2,318
1981: 1,835
1991: 1,488

See also
List of places in Serbia
List of cities, towns and villages in Vojvodina

References
Slobodan Ćurčić, Broj stanovnika Vojvodine, Novi Sad, 1996.

External links 

HV partner Mala Bosna

Places in Bačka
Subotica
Bunjevci